Zac Incerti (born 13 July 1996) is an Australian swimmer. He competed in the men's 100 metre backstroke event at the 2017 World Aquatics Championships. He also competed at the 2020 Summer Olympics in Tokyo, where he won two bronze medals.

References

External links
 

1996 births
Living people
Australian male backstroke swimmers
Swimmers at the 2018 Commonwealth Games
Swimmers at the 2022 Commonwealth Games
Commonwealth Games medallists in swimming
Place of birth missing (living people)
Commonwealth Games gold medallists for Australia
Commonwealth Games bronze medallists for Australia
Olympic bronze medalists in swimming
Olympic bronze medalists for Australia
Swimmers at the 2020 Summer Olympics
Medalists at the 2020 Summer Olympics
Australian male freestyle swimmers
World Aquatics Championships medalists in swimming
20th-century Australian people
21st-century Australian people
Medallists at the 2018 Commonwealth Games
Medallists at the 2022 Commonwealth Games